Big Brothers Big Sisters is a charitable youth mentoring program, and may refer to:

Big Brothers Big Sisters of America
Big Brothers Big Sisters of Canada
Big Brothers Big Sisters of New York City	
Big Brothers Big Sisters of Northern Nevada

See also